Iridium 33 was a communications satellite launched by Russia for Iridium Communications. It was launched into low Earth orbit from Site 81/23 at the Baikonur Cosmodrome at 01:36 UTC on 14 September 1997, by a Proton-K rocket with a Block DM2 upper stage. The launch was arranged by International Launch Services (ILS). It was operated in Plane 3 of the Iridium satellite constellation, with an ascending node of 230.9°.

Mission
Iridium 33 was part of a commercial communications network consisting of a constellation of 66 LEO spacecraft. The system uses L-Band to provide global communications services through portable handsets. Commercial service began in 1998. The system employs ground stations with a master control complex in Landsdowne, Virginia, a backup in Italy, and a third engineering center in Chandler, Arizona.

Spacecraft
The spacecraft was 3-axis stabilized, with a hydrazine propulsion system. It had 2 solar panels with 1-axis articulation. The system employed L-Band using FDMA/TDMA to provide voice at 4.8 kbps and data at 2400 bps with a 16 dB margin. Each satellite had 48 spot beams for Earth coverage and used Ka-Band for crosslinks and ground commanding.

Destruction

On 10 February 2009, at 16:56 UTC, at about 800 km altitude, Kosmos 2251 (1993-036A) (a derelict Strela satellite) and Iridium 33 collided, resulting in the destruction of both spacecraft. NASA reported that a large amount of space debris was produced by the collision, i.e. 1347 debris for Kosmos 2251 and 528 for Iridium 33.

See also
Kessler syndrome

References

Communications satellites in low Earth orbit
2009 in spaceflight
Satellite collisions
Satellites formerly orbiting Earth
Spacecraft launched in 1997
Iridium satellites
Spacecraft that broke apart in space